Lipocosma pitilia is a moth in the family Crambidae. It was described by Maria Alma Solis and David Adamski in 1998. It is found in Costa Rica.

The length of the forewings is 6.8-7.4 mm. The ground colour of the forewings is white with brown postmedial and subterminal lines. The antemedial lines are pale brown, but may be absent. There is a small brown subcostal spot between the subterminal and postmedial lines. There are pale brown lines on the hindwings. The areas between these lines is white, mixed with pale brown scales.

Etymology
The species name refers to Estacion Pitilla, the type locality.

References

Glaphyriinae
Moths described in 1998